Fontainebleau State Park is located in St. Tammany Parish, Louisiana, on the north shore of Lake Pontchartrain. The park has a multitude of habitats for birds.

History
The visitor center highlights the history of the land which was once owned by the wealthy Bernard de Marigny (1785–1868) of New Orleans and founder of Mandeville, which lies directly to the west of Fontainebleau Park. Marigny operated a sugar mill that was built in 1829. He named his large holding Fontainebleau after the beautiful forest near Paris, France. In 1840, his son Armand documented the presence of 153 enslaved individuals at the site, including 57 children under the age of ten.

Fontainebleau State Park is surrounded on three sides by water: Lake Pontchartrain, Bayou Cane, and Bayou Castine. The state originally named the park Tchefuncte State Park and Conservation Reservation, after the Tchefuncte River.

The park was added to the National Register of Historic Places in 1999.

Overnight features
 12 cabins; six are handicapped-accessible including two that are ADA-compliant.
 163 RV and tenting campsites, many with utilities
 Comfort stations with showers
 Playground
 Three group camps and a lodge
 Around 200 camping sites in total

Day use facilities
 A  hiking trail.
 A  nature trail. The nature trail includes a boardwalk into the marsh.
 Picnic area and playground.
 Pavilion.
 Beach, fishing pond, and fishing pier.
 Visitor center with museum displays, interpretive programs, and gift shop.
 The Tammany Trace crosses Fontainebleau State Park. This is a rail-trail conversion of the old Illinois Central corridor, and is a  paved trail for hiking, inline skating, and bicycling, with a parallel equestrian trail.

See also
Tchefuncte site, an archaeological site in the park
Fairview-Riverside State Park
List of Louisiana state parks

References

External links
Fontainebleau State Park 

State parks of Louisiana
Protected areas of St. Tammany Parish, Louisiana
Protected areas established in 1942
1942 establishments in Louisiana